François Louis-Marie (born 13 October 1961) is a French Guianan professional football manager.

Career
Since 2004 until 2005 and since 2012 until 2013 (together with Hubert Contout) he coached the French Guiana national football team.

References

External links

1961 births
Living people
French football managers
French Guianan football managers
French Guiana national football team managers
Place of birth missing (living people)